São Bento is a civil parish in the municipality of Porto de Mós, Portugal. The population in 2021 was 751, in an area of 39.70 km2. It was created on 31 May 1933 by law No.22:602.

References 

Parishes of Porto de Mós